Fort George Brewery is located in Astoria, Oregon, United States, and produces over 40 varieties of beer distributed throughout Oregon, Washington, and Idaho. It is the 15th largest brewery in the state of Oregon and among the fastest growing breweries in the U.S.

History 
Fort George Brewery and Public House was opened in March 2007 on the site of the first American settlement on the U.S. west coast, Fort Astoria (also known as Fort George). The brewery, which originally opened in the Fort George Building with an 8.5-barrel fermentation and conditioning tanks, expanded into the neighboring Lovell Building in 2010 with the addition of a 30-barrel system, a canning line, and the opening of the Lovell Taproom.  They have since expanded into the second floor of the Fort George Building with a wood-fired pizzeria. In 2011, Fort George Brewery began distributing cans of their Vortex IPA, 1811 Lager, and Cavatica Stout in Oregon and Southwest Washington.  By the summer of 2012, they added Quick Wit and Sunrise Oatmeal Pale Ale to their canned line-up.  In 2013, the brewery released their first canned seasonal 16-oz beer, Tender Loving Empire North West Pale Ale (NWPA). Since then, new seasonals and year-round canned varieties have been added including 3-Way IPA, Magnanimous IPA, Fresh IPA, The Optimist, Big Guns Session IPA, and City of Dreams.

Beers

Regulars 
 Quick Wit
 Big Guns Session IPA
 City of Dreams
 The Optimist
 Vortex IPA
 Cavatica Stout

Seasonals 
 Matryoshka and Matryoshka Variations
 1,000 Years of Silence
 CoHoperative Ale
 Spruce Budd Ale
 3-Way IPA
 Suicide Squeeze IPA
 Fresh IPA
 Magnanimous IPA
 Overdub IPA
 From Astoria With Love

Occasionals 
 Java the Hop
 Beta IPA (Test Batch Series)
 Sweet Virginia Series
 Bourbon Barrel Cavatica Stout
 Hellcat
 Kentucky Girl
 OMEGATEX
 Three Wisemen

References

External links

 

2007 establishments in Oregon
Astoria, Oregon
Beer brewing companies based in Oregon